Air Swell (stylized as AIR SWELL) is a 3-piece Japanese rock band hailing from Shikoku but currently based in Tokyo. They describe their style as a mix of alternative, industrial, britpop, emo, grunge, punk and heavy rock resulting in a multi-layered-instruments-and-vocals rock sound.

History 
At the heart of AIR SWELL is singer/guitarist Hamaken who is not only the band's composer, lyricist and music arranger but is also a concert promoter / event organizer of his own Kuroshio Drive. They started with two self-produced mini albums in 2010 your fairytale is neverending (released on 21 Feb 2010) and ツナガルキズナ (released on 20 August 2010).

Currently, their music is distributed by JMS (Japan Music System) which is a music distribution company handling mainly indie artists in Japan.

Their first album under a record label (INNOVATOR Records) is RIMFIRE (released on 2 August 2012) and their first album to be distributed by JMS. Hamaken showed a wide range of songwriting and music arranging with a variety of songs from their signature multi layered rock sound such as the song "FAST LANE" to the pop rock バッドボーイズセレナーデ ("Bad Boys Serenade"). RIMFIRE also features singer Hiro from the band MY FIRST STORY in the song "JAP POPPER". The two bands met through the small clubs and Livehouses circuit and Hamaken invited Hiro to be a guest singer in the song, saying he liked Hiro's voice.

They then released a mini album THE ART OF PSYCHO on 5 June 2013 with the 1st track "I will pay back" chosen to be made into an MV.

JMS A&R Executive Kentaro Suzuki put them into the BONEDS 4 Bands Split Album project to help expose 4 selected bands under JMS namely AIR SWELL, BLUE ENCOUNT, SWANKY DANK and MY FIRST STORY in 2013. Each band was asked to contribute two new songs to the album and AIR SWELL contributed "No Going Back" and ゴブリンズスケルシォ. The latter song features screaming vocals by U from the band ANGRY FROG REBIRTH. The album BONEDS was released on 30 November 2013 by INTACT Records. It was followed by a successful 9-city joint Tour of all the four bands.

In April 2014, they performed as opening acts alongside SiM on Skindred's Japan Tour for 4 dates.

The band released a mini album entitled All Lead Tracks on 4 June 2014. This time, Roach's singer taama was invited as a guest singer on one of the tracks バイバイゲロメタル. This album peaked at number 51 on the Oricon Albums Chart.

In October 2014, bassist Taisuke announced his withdrawal from the band. He cited his reason as "circumstances that made him unable to give 100% to the band anymore" but did not elaborate more to the public. He played his last show with AIR SWELL on 26 October 2014 at Yokohama FAD which was them playing as the guest band for MY FIRST STORY's 虚言NEUROSE Tour.

The band then continued with bassist Hiromitsu who started as a support member at the time. Just like Taisuke, Hiromitsu is a finger-picking bass player. They started working on another album and MY CYLINDERs was released on 25 March 2015 with Hiromitsu already an official member by then. This album peaked at number 57 on the Oricon Albums Chart.

AIR SWELL reunited with their BONEDS rival bands for BONEDS Special Night on 17 July 2015 at Shinkiba Studio Coast, Tokyo.

In June 2016, the band released a special edition CD entitled ツナガルキスナ - unplugged mix in order to donate the proceeds from the sales to the victims of 2016 Kumamoto earthquakes.

AIR SWELL released another EP SIX KILLS on 25 January 2017.

Band members 
Current members
 Hamaken — vocals, guitar (2006–present)
 Hiromitsu — bass, vocals (2014–present)
 Yudai — drums (2006–present)

Former members
 Taisuke — bass (2006–2014)

Timeline

Discography

Albums

Mini albums

Singles

Compilation appearances

Collaborations

References

External links 
 AIR SWELL Official Website
 AIR SWELL Official Twitter
 AIR SWELL Official Facebook
 AIR SWELL Hamaken Twitter
 AIR SWELL Yudai Twitter
 AIR SWELL Hiromitsu Twitter

Japanese alternative rock groups
Japanese rock music groups
Musical groups established in 2006